Jana Novotná and Helena Suková were the defending champions, but Suková did not compete this year.

Novotná teamed up with Gigi Fernández and lost in the final to Mary Joe Fernández and Zina Garrison. The score was 7–5, 6–2.

Seeds
All seeded players received a bye into the second round.

Draw

Finals

Top half

Section 1

Section 2

Bottom half

Section 3

Section 4

References

External links
 Official results archive (ITF)
 Official results archive (WTA)

Women's Doubles